Roar Engelberg (born 26 July 1964 in Hamar, Norway) is the first international Norwegian artist on Panpipes, known for his long lasting and productive cooperation with Stein-Erik Olsen.

Career
Engelberg became interested in panpipes as a 12-year-old when he heard the Romanian panpipe player Georghe Zamfir on the radio. He then taught himself to play the instrument, and later studied in Hilversum with Nicolai Pirvu (1985–88). After his debut in London in 1986, he toured with Iver Kleive and Stein-Erik Olsen in Norway and around the world.

He received the 2007 award "Meritul Cultural în gradul de Cavaler" of the Romanian state for his many years of effort for the music of Romania.

Honors
«Meritul Cultural în gradul de Cavaler" awarded by the Romanian state

Discography
1985: Alveland, with Iver Kleive 
1986: Panorama, with Iver Kleive og Stein-Erik Olsen
1988: Julefred
1989: Mosaic, with Stein-Erik Olsen
1989: Herdens flöjt – Julesånger på pan-flöjt
1990: Doina
1991: Masterpieces of the Beatles
1992: Café Europa 1992, with the Orchestra Primas
1994: Balletto, with Stein-Erik Olsen
1999: Har en drøm
2000: O pasâre strâinâ
2001: Fløyelstoner, with Stein-Erik Olsen
2002: Julefryd
2007: Inimǎ de lǎutar
2010: Suite Latina, with Stein-Erik Olsen
2011: Willie Nickerson's Egg, guest soloist with Jon Larsen and Tommy Mars

References

External links

Roar Engelberg & Stein-Erik Olsen

1964 births
Living people
Musicians from Hamar
Norwegian flautists
Norwegian classical musicians